Notocypraea is a genus of sea snail, a cowry, a marine gastropod mollusk in the family Cypraeidae, the cowries.

Species
Notocypraea angustata (Gmelin, 1791)
Notocypraea comptoni (Gray, 1847)
Notocypraea declivis (G.B. Sowerby II, 1870)
Notocypraea dissecta Iredale, 1930
Notocypraea piperita (Gray, 1825)
Notocypraea pulicaria (Reeve, 1846)
Notocypraea subcarnea (Beddome, 1897)
Taxon inquirendum
 Notocypraea occidentalis Iredale, 1935 
Species brought into synonymy
 Notocypraea bicolor (Gaskoin, 1849): synonym of Notocypraea piperita bicolor (Gaskoin, 1849)
 Notocypraea casta Schilder & Summers, 1963: synonym of Notocypraea comptonii (Gray, 1847)
 Notocypraea hartsmithi (Schilder, 1967): synonym of Notocypraea dissecta Iredale, 1931
 Notocypraea musumea (Kuroda & Habe, 1961): synonym of Palmulacypraea musumea (Kuroda & Habe, 1961)
 Notocypraea verconis Cotton & Godfrey, 1932: synonym of Notocypraea angustata (Gmelin, 1791)

References

 Biolib
 WoRMS

External links
 Iredale, T. (1935). Australian cowries. The Australian Zoologist. 8(2): 96-135, pls 8-9

Cypraeidae